Octopus tetricus, the gloomy octopus or the common Sydney octopus, is a species of octopus from the subtropical waters of eastern Australia and New Zealand. O. tetricus belongs to the Octopus vulgaris species group and is a commercially prized species. All species within the O. vulgaris group are similar in morphology. The English translation of O. tetricus (Latin) is 'the gloomy octopus'.

Distribution 
Octopus tetricus was originally discovered in New South Wales and was also found along the eastern Australian coastline. It occurs from Lakes Entrance in Victoria  to Moreton Bay in southern Queensland. Octopus tetricus is distributed in the subtropical seas of eastern Australia and northern New Zealand, including Lord Howe Island. A close relative, Octopus djinda, occurs at similar latitudes in Western Australia, from Shark Bay to Cape Le Grand, and was considered to be conspecific with O. tetricus until 2021.

Anatomy and morphology 
Octopus tetricus is normally coloured grey to mottled brown with rufous arm faces that taper towards the tip. Their eyes are typically white in colour, and the skin has many small regular shaped patches and large warty structures which are used by the octopus to make it look spiky, which are used by the octopus when it is camouflaging itself as seaweed.

Life cycle

Reproduction and growth 
The reproductive cycle of females is tied to seasonal changes, similar to many other species. Females reach maturity around Australia's spring and summer seasons in order to mate and lay eggs. During the mating process the male O. tetricus passes spermatophores to the female in two different ways. The male either wraps his arms and web around the female's mantle or reaches his mating arm from a distance and inserts it into the female's mantle. Spermatophores are released from the male's "terminal organ", moved by the male's oral suckers, and then the spermatophores are inserted into the female's oviduct.

Octopus tetricus start out as eggs that are laid in large numbers in the octopuses nest. The eggs are normally glued to the rock or substrate at the top of the den created by the female octopus. The female usually lays her eggs over several nights in a string formation. The size and number of strings of eggs usually depends on how large the female is and can have between 60 and 200 egg strings. The female then guards the eggs until they hatch. Female O. tetricus have also been known to store viable spermatozoa for up to 114 days. The amount of time embryonic development takes varies with water temperature, and newly hatched O. tetricus larvae are about 2.5 mm long and 1.1mm wide.  These larvae go through a stage called the paralarval stage where they are considered planktonic, or free floating, organisms before they settle to the bottom and grow large enough to hunt for their food. This stage may last around 35–60 days. The females of O. tetricus have been known to cannibalise the males following mating.

Temperature plays a key role in growth of this octopus species. With a good food supply, octopuses that reside in areas with a cooler water temperature tend to grow slower during the key growth phase and when they reach maturity they are generally larger than octopuses that are found in warmer water temperatures.

Lifespan 
Adult O. tetricus is observed to have a relatively small body size and a lifespan of approximately 11 months. Female O. tetricus rarely eat or sleep during the protection of the nest and die shortly after the eggs hatch. Females are found to mature at a slower rate and become larger than male O. tetricus.

Habitat and behavioural ecology

Habitat 
Octopus tetricus occurs in the intertidal zone along rocky shores and in the ocean and it has been suggested that this species is associated more commonly with rocky reefs during the breeding season, although they frequent areas of the sea bed with soft-sediments for much of their life. O. tetricus alter their habitats by digging out dens and using remains from prey, including but not limited to shells. It is very common for scallop beds to be found in close proximity to the excavated dens. The scallops serve as a food source and their shells are part of the shell beds built. This species of octopus is considered to be an ecosystem engineer. This means that the way they create their habitats influences and builds an ecosystem around their dwellings. The shell beds that are created around the excavated dens attract hermit crabs and fish due to the various hiding places created. Small fish and other small prey species attract larger species and the cycle builds, creating an ecosystem. A solid object can serve as a good den that can also be the start of a new settlement for O. tetricus. Studies show that O. tetricus has higher populations in patch reef habitats than broken reef habitats, and were scarcely found on flat reefs. Adult O. tetricus were also found to occupy coastal reefs in the summer and then disappear around the second week of April, which is the second week of autumn in Australia. Shelters serve a vital role in octopus ecology. The species is generally known to be solitary, but complex social behaviours have been observed by scientists.

Social behaviour and mating 
Scientists have observed many different behaviours exhibited by O. tetricus including, signalling, mating, mate defence, and aggression. Some have even observed an octopus evicting another from its den. Occasionally this aggressive behaviour led to physical altercations between octopuses. It is a  territorial species which sits out the day in a lair among rocks and rubble, the rubble being collected to create a defensible lair. The lairs of this species can be identified by the shells of the octopus's prey which it scatters around its home. They move about the rocks by crawling using their arms but they can use their siphon to propel themselves through the water by generating a jet of water or to move (throw) shells, silt, and algae.

Observation of mating behaviours has revealed that O. tetricus females have a stronger precopulatory preference for males that have longer mating appendages, or ligulae. Both female and male octopuses mate multiple times throughout a mating season. Female octopuses are able to accept multiple spermatophores from males but they only produce one brood of eggs at the end of a mating season.

Feeding and hunting 
Octopus tetricus is primarily a nocturnal feeder which uses its sharp beak to feed on crustaceans and molluscs, for example sea snails and bivalves. It has also been recorded as being cannibalistic.

Two areas in Jervis Bay where they congregate have been dubbed Octopolis and Octlantis, containing a large area of discarded shells where ten or more octopuses den and mate.

Fisheries 
Octopus tetricus may be caught as bycatch in trawl and lobster-pot fisheries and is then sold for both human consumption and for use as bait.

References 

Octopodidae
Cephalopods described in 1852